Cascade Boy Scout Camp is a camp near Durango in San Juan County, Colorado, United States that is associated with Scouting in Colorado.  The lodge building, also known as Cascade Lodge or Boy Scout Lodge, was built in 1928 and was listed on the National Register of Historic Places in 1988.  It is also listed on the Colorado Register of Historic Places.

The two-story lodge building is built in the shape of a cross.  Constructed by local residents adjacent to the Million Dollar Highway, it was intended for use by various community organizations, including the Boy Scouts, but also including other youth groups.  Located in the San Juan National Forest, the site is not now operated as a summer camp.

Sold into private hands in the 1930s, it is now a Christian retreat center.

References

1928 establishments in Colorado
National Register of Historic Places in Colorado
Rustic architecture in Colorado
Buildings and structures in San Juan County, Colorado
Youth organizations based in Colorado
Local council camps of the Boy Scouts of America
Temporary populated places on the National Register of Historic Places